Jan-Willem van Schip (born 20 August 1994) is a Dutch professional road and track cyclist, who currently rides for UCI Continental team . He rode in the men's team pursuit at the 2016 UCI Track Cycling World Championships.

Major results

Road

2016
 1st Grote Prijs Marcel Kint
 1st Stage 1 Tour of Mersin
 3rd Time trial, National Under-23 Championships
 3rd Kernen Omloop Echt-Susteren
 4th Overall Olympia's Tour
1st  Points classification
1st Stage 2
 6th ZODC Zuidenveld Tour
 7th Ronde van Overijssel
2017
 1st Ronde van Drenthe
 1st Stage 3 Tour de Normandie
 1st Stage 2 An Post Rás
 1st Stage 3 Okolo Jižních Čech
 5th Gooikse Pijl
 5th Ronde van Noord-Holland
 10th Arno Wallaard Memorial
2018
 1st Slag om Norg
 4th Great War Remembrance Race
 5th Antwerp Port Epic
 8th Tour de l'Eurométropole
2019
 1st Stage 1 Tour of Belgium
 4th Omloop van het Houtland
 7th Dwars door het Hageland
 8th Heistse Pijl
 8th Antwerp Port Epic
2021
 2nd Ronde van de Achterhoek
2022
 7th Overall ZLM Tour

Track

2017
 National Championships
1st  Omnium
2nd Scratch
2nd Points race
2nd Madison
2018
 1st Omnium, UCI World Cup, Minsk
 UCI World Championships
2nd  Points race
2nd  Omnium
 National Championships
2nd Scratch
2nd Points race
2019
 1st  Points race, UCI World Championships
 European Games
1st  Omnium
2nd  Points race
2nd  Madison (with Yoeri Havik)
 1st  Omnium, National Championships
 UEC European Championships
2nd  Madison (with Yoeri Havik)
2nd  Points race
2020
 UCI World Cup
1st Madison (with Yoeri Havik), Milton
1st Omnium, Milton
 2nd  Omnium, UCI World Championships
2021
 1st  Madison (with Yoeri Havik), UEC European Championships
2022
 UCI Nations Cup
1st Madison (with Yoeri Havik), Milton
2nd Omnium, Milton

References

External links

1994 births
Living people
Dutch male cyclists
Dutch track cyclists
People from Houten
Cyclists from Utrecht (province)
Olympic cyclists of the Netherlands
Cyclists at the 2016 Summer Olympics
Cyclists at the 2020 Summer Olympics
UCI Track Cycling World Champions (men)
Cyclists at the 2019 European Games
European Games medalists in cycling
European Games gold medalists for the Netherlands
European Games silver medalists for the Netherlands
20th-century Dutch people
21st-century Dutch people